La Verdad may refer to:
 La Verdad (horse), a racehorse
 La Verdad (Maracaibo), a Venezuelan regional newspaper
 La Verdad (Murcia), a daily newspaper based in Murcia, Spain